The Federal University of the São Francisco Valley (UNIVASF) is a publicly funded university serving the São Francisco Valley in the states of Pernambuco, Bahia and Piauí in Brazil. It is headquartered in Petrolina and has campuses in the municipalities of Juazeiro, Senhor do Bonfim, and Paulo Afonso, Bahia; Petrolina, and Salgueiro Pernambuco; and São Raimundo Nonato, Piauí. In 2019, the university enrolled a total of 6,211 students across all campuses in 31 programs of study.

In 2019, Folha de São Paulo ranked UNIVASF 106th nationally, with its animal science program ranked in the top 25.

History 
The university was created with a federal law passed on June 27, 2002, with a mandate to operate across state lines in the historically under-developed semi-arid Sertão of Brazil's northeast. It began operations in 2004. From 2015, its medical school was affiliated with a teaching hospital in Petrolina: the Hospital Universitário da Universidade Federal do Vale do São Francisco.

References

External links 

  

Vale do Sao Francisco, Universidade Federal
Universities and colleges in Pernambuco
Universities and colleges in Bahia
Universities and colleges in Piauí
Educational institutions established in 2002
2002 establishments in Brazil
Petrolina